172P/Yeung is a periodic comet in the Solar System.

References

External links 
 172P on Seiichi Yoshida's comet list
 172P on Gary Kronk's Cometography
 

Periodic comets
0172